Azerbaijani SS volunteer formations were recruited from prisoners of war, mainly from the Soviet Union and the countries annexed by it after 1939. The volunteers composed of patriots who wanted to fight the Russians for an independent Azerbaijan.

Origins

In November 1943, Meyer-Mader offered his services to Himmler to help raise and command a Turkic SS unit. Himmler approved the broad plan and then transferred him into the ranks of the Waffen-SS and promoted him to the rank of SS-Obersturmbannführer. Then, on 14 December, a meeting was held in Berlin in the presence of the Grand Mufti of Jerusalem, Amin al-Husseini. The Grand Mufti approved the plan to raise a Turkic-Muslim SS division and to give his "spiritual leadership" to influence the Muslim volunteers.

Ostmuselmanisches SS-Regiment

Between November 1943 and January 1944, there was a series of meetings between Meyer-Mader and Muslim volunteers. As a result of these meetings, on January 4, 1944, it was decided to form the Ostmuselmanisches SS-Regiment. At the same meeting, it was decided to disband the following Wehrmacht battalions who would serve as a basis for a new platform: 450th, 480th, 782nd, 786th, 790th, 791st and I/94th Turkestanische battalions, Aserbeidschanische 818th and Volga Tatar 831st. Unfortunately, many of the volunteers deserted at this time, and the 818th defected to Polish and Ukrainian resistance movements in 1943.
 
Furthermore, at the same time, Meyer-Mader visited prisoners of war camps and called for volunteers to join the new Muslim SS legion. The recruits were not only Turkestani but also Azerbaijani, Kyrgyz, Uzbek, and Tajik. By the end of January 1944, he was able to recruit three thousand volunteers who were concentrated in Poniatova. To increase the staffing regiment, dozens of German officers and non-commissioned officers were transferred there. Nevertheless, it was a prolonged process, mainly due to a lack of equipment, including uniforms and even shoes. Therefore, by the October 1944 deadline, which Himmler appointed for the deployment of divisions, the regiment had only four thousand people formed into three battalions.

The unit was formed in Trawniki, Poland, before they were transferred to Byelorussia for further training. SS-Obersturmbannführer Andreas Meyer-Mader was appointed as its first commander.

This unit suffered from poor discipline, and poor morale, especially after Meyer-Mader was killed during a skirmish with partisans in Yuratishki, near Minsk, on March 28, 1944. The situation worsened when the replacement commander, SS-Hauptsturmführer Billig, executed 78 unit members for insubordination. This incident angered Himmler, who relieved Billig. In May 1944, the 550 men (Turkestanis, Volga Tatars, Azerbaijanis, Kyrgyz, Uzbeks, and Tajiks) from the Ostmuslemanische SS-Regiment were attached to the SS Dirlewanger brigade.

Warsaw 

On January 29, 1944, Heinz Reinefarth was assigned as SS and Police Leader in Reichsgau Wartheland (the pre-war Polish Greater Poland Voivodeship, annexed by Germany in 1939). In this post, he was responsible for the organised repression against Poles and other nationalities deprived of all rights by Germany. After the outbreak of the Warsaw Uprising, Reinefarth was ordered to organise a military unit from the 16th Police Company and other smaller security units and head for Warsaw. Upon arrival, his forces were included in the Korpsgruppe Von Dem Bach of General Erich von dem Bach-Zelewski who Himmler ordered to quell the rebellion. From August 5, 1944, Reinefarth's group fought in the Wola area. In several days, his and Dirlewanger's soldiers executed approximately 40,000 civilian inhabitants of Warsaw in what is now known as the Wola massacre. The Wola killings were mostly inflicted by Kampfgruppe Reinefarth that assaulted the area held by the insurgents from the west.

It is hard to determine which specific units are to be held responsible, but the main “cleansing” tasks had been assigned to Angriffsgruppe Dirlewanger with following forces:

 2 Grenadier Battalions (I & II) of SS Sonderregiment Dirlewanger, 
 Aserbeidschanisches Feld Bataillon I./111 (com. Hptm. Werner Scharrenberg), 
 Ostmuselmanisches SS Regiment (without Battalion III), 
 II Btl. "Bergmann" – (without 7. Komp.) Ltn. Mertelsmann, 
 Gendermerie Operationsgruppe Walter (2 gendarmerie Komp.), 
 Komp. I & II of Aserb. Feld Btl. I/111, 
 Anti-aircraft battery of 80th Regiment, 
 Sturmpanzer-Kompanie z.b.V. 218 (8x Brummbär) Hptm. Kellmann,
 a part of machine gun 4. Kompanie of Aserb. Feld Btl. I/111, 
 1. Platoon of 654. Pioniere Battalion, 
 1 KRONE flamethrower unit (8x Flammenwerfer 41)

Lack of precise documentation does not allow to specify precisely which elements of the above were involved in the Wola killing. It is also possible that some units of the other assault group that operated in the Wola area (Angriffsgruppe Reck) were taking active part in the events, as they also consisted of police/gendarmerie and special assignment units (Hptm. Kirchhubel's Warschau Polizei Kompanie, Hptm. Fersemann's Polizei Wachtkompanie, platoon of SS-Röntgen MG Kompanie from Poznań, but also SS Grenadiere of SS-Schule Treskau and Azerbaijani 7.Komp/II Bt. Bergmann).

Osttürkische Waffen-Verbände der SS 

On October 20, 1944, the rest of the Ostmuselmanisches SS-Regiment was transferred from Ukraine to Slovakia and renamed "Osttürkische Waffen-Verbände der SS" and reorganized into 3 battalions organized along ethnic lines.
1 Waffengruppe Turkestan
1 Waffengruppe Aserbeidschan (2851 soldiers: Gerhard von Mende archives)
1 Waffengruppe Idel-Ural

Each battalion would consist of staff, one staff company and five infantry companies. The Ostmuselmanisches regiment was integrated into the Osttürkische Waffen-Verbände der SS and was considered to be dissolved. In December 1944 The Waffen-Gruppe Aserbeidschan (commander W-Ostuf Kerrar Alesgerli) was transferred to the Kaukasiche Waffen-Verbände der SS. The disbanded Tatar Waffen Gebirgs Brigade der SS would replace the Azerbaijani soldiers; Commander: SS-Standartenführer Harun el-Raschid Hintersatz. (born Wilhelm Hintersatz (A German officer, born in Senftenberg, Lausitz, who had converted to Islam in 1919.) 

The reorganisations began in January 1945 as follows:

 SS-Waffengruppe Turkestan
 SS-Waffengruppe Krim
 SS-Waffengruppe Idel Urals

Apparently, new “volunteers” were integrated because the Osttürkische Waffen-Verbände had increased from 5,000 men in January 1945 to 8,500 men in the period of February–May 1945. As Hitler's Reich crumbled, the Waffen-SS gave up all adherence to standards for recruit selection. If they could walk and shoot a rifle, they were good enough for the SS. At this time, all German military forces were scraping the bottom of the manpower barrel - for example, in January 1945, Heer and Waffen-SS recruiting centres were combined. Waffen-SS troops were increasingly transfers from other military branches of the Wehrmacht from paramilitary and labour formations. The whole unit arrived in March 1945 in Merate, 20 km north of Milan, northern Italy. Assigned to the area's defence, the Osttürkische Waffen-Verbände apparently participated in no larger operation against partisans. On 26 April 1945, Hintersatz signed a pact with the local partisan command, according to which the soldiers would remain in the barracks in Merate until the US troops arrived. This happened on 30 April 1945, the whole unit went into the 1st Armored Division's hands.

Kaukasischer Waffen-Verband der SS 

In December 1944, while training in Slovakia, a rumour that the unit was to be transferred to Russian Liberation Army demoralized the soldiers. On December 24, 450 men deserted on Christmas Eve, although 300 eventually returned. The Azerberjani regiment was removed from the Osttürkische Waffen-Verbände on 30 December 1944, and transferred to Kaukasischer Waffen-Verband der SS.

Kaukasischer Waffen-Verband der SS, also known as Freiwilligen Brigade Nordkaukasien, began forming with volunteers from the Caucasus region, with the Frewilligen-Stamm-Division as a nucleus. It was transferred from the Neuhammer training camp to Paluzza in northern Italy in Jan. 1945 and was still forming when it surrendered to British forces at the end of the war.

Commander: SS-Standartenführer Arved Theuermann
Organisation:
Stab Kaukasischer Waffen-Verband der SS
Stab Waffen-Gruppe Armenien
Stab Waffen-Gruppe Nordkaukasus
Stab Waffen-Gruppe Georgien
Stab Waffen-Gruppe Aserbeidschan (1090 soldiers: Gerhard von Mende archives)

See also
 Azerbaijani Legion
 Free Arabian Legion
 Ostlegionen
Israfil Israfilov

References

Notes

Bibliography

Further reading
Eduard Abramian - Forgotten Legion: Sonderverbände Bergmann in World War II 1941-1945.
Eduard Abramian -Kavkatsy v Abvere . Moscow 2006
Christopher Ailsby - Hitler's Renegades: Foreign Nationals in the Service of the Third Reich.
Wladyslaw Anders - Russian Volunteers in Hitler's Army 1941-1945.
Christopher Bishop - SS Hitler's Foreign Divisions: Foreign Volunteers in the Waffen SS 1940-1945.
J. Borsarello & W. Palinckx - Wehrmacht & SS: Caucasian, Muslim, Asian Troops.
Dallin A. German Rule in Russia 1941–1945: A Study of occupation policies. London New York, 1957.
Littlejohn D. Foreign Legions of the Third Reich: In 4 vols. San Jose, 1987. Vol.4.
Antonio J. Muñoz - The East Came West: Muslim, Hindu & Buddhist Volunteers in the German Armed Forces 1941-1945.
Munoz, Antonio J. Forgotten Legions: Obscure Combat Formations of the Waffen SS. Axis-Europa Books, 1991.
Antonio Muñoz & Dr Oleg V. Romanko - Hitler's White Russians: Collaboration, Extermination and Anti-Partisan Warfare in Byelorussia 1941-1944.
Foreign Volunteers of the Wehrmacht 1941-45 K. Yurado
Tessin, Georg: Verbände und Truppen der deutschen Wehrmacht und Waffen-SS im Zweiten Weltkrieg 1939-1945. 20 Bde. Osnabrück 1967 ff.
Held, Walter: Verbände und Truppen der deutschen Wehrmacht und Waffen-SS im Zweiten Weltkrieg. Eine Bibliographie der deutschsprachigen Nachkriegsliteratur. 5 Bde. Osnabrück 1978 ff.
Joachim Hoffmann: Die Ostlegionen 1941–1943. Turkotartaren, Kaukasier und Wolgafinnen im deutschen Heer. Freiburg 1976.
Jeloschek, Albert und Friedrich Richter, Ehrenfried Schütte, Johannes Semmler: Freiwillige vom Kaukasus. Georgier & Tschetschenen auf deutscher Seite. „Der Sonderverband Bergmann“ unter Theo Oberländer. Graz, Stuttgart 2003.
ВА-МА, Oberkommando des Heeres / Generalstab des Heeres, H 1/136, bl. 64
NARA. Microcopy T-354. Roll 161. Frames 3806724 through 3807091.

1940s in Azerbaijan
Azerbaijani collaborators with Nazi Germany
Foreign volunteer units of the Waffen-SS